Rufus Lenoir Patterson (June 22, 1830 – July 15, 1879) was an American businessman and politician from North Carolina. Born into a prominent family, Patterson received private schooling before matriculating at the University of North Carolina. Electing to forgo a career in law, Patterson studied in a banking house and founded a series of mills in Salem, North Carolina. He served on the county court and was elected to a term as Mayor of Salem. Patterson was twice a delegate to state constitutional conventions. He was the father of Rufus Lenoir Patterson Jr.

Biography
Rufus Lenoir Patterson was born in Caldwell County, North Carolina on June 22, 1830, to a prominent family. He was the eldest son of Samuel F. Patterson, a politician who was a North Carolina State Treasurer, and the great-grandson of Revolutionary War officer William Lenoir. A younger brother, Samuel L. Patterson, was a North Carolina Commissioner of Agriculture. Patterson split time in his youth at Caldwell County and Raleigh, North Carolina, where his father worked. He attended the Raleigh Academy then schooled under Episcopal minister T. S. W. Mott.

Patterson graduated from the University of North Carolina in 1851, then studied law under future U.S. Representative John Adams Gilmer. However, he found the study of law unappealing and, after a brief period farming at the family homestead, decided to pursue a career in business. He moved to Greensboro to study banking under Jesse H. Lindsay, his wife's uncle. With the financial backing of former Governor of North Carolina John Motley Morehead, his father-in-law, Patterson opened a flour, cotton, and paper mill in Salem, North Carolina.

The success of the mills made Patterson one of the growing town's most prominent citizens. In 1855, he was elected to the Forsyth County Court as a Democrat, where he served for five years. Although he was disillusioned with the direction the party was heading, he nonetheless approved the state's ordinance of secession at the 1861 North Carolina Constitutional Convention. He sold his mills in 1862 and returned to Caldwell County. There, he managed his father's cotton factory in Patterson until it was burned during Stoneman's 1865 Raid. Later that year he was again a delegate to the state constitutional convention.

After the Civil War Patterson returned to Salem. He partnered with his new brother-in-law Henry W. Fries to operate several cotton and paper mills, including the Fries Cotton Mill. They also established a general merchandise store and Patterson invested in a railroad. He served as a director of the Northwestern and Western North Carolina Railroads. He served a term as trustee of North Carolina University in 1874. In 1875, he was elected Mayor of Salem, serving a one-year term.

Patterson married Marie Louise Morehead in 1852. They had five children: Jesse Lindsay, Carrier F., Lettie W., Louis Morehead (died in adolescence), and a son that died in infancy. Marie died in 1862 and Patterson married Mary E. Fries two years later. They had six children: Frank F., Samuel F., Andrew H., Rufus L., John L., and Edmond V. Rufus Lenoir Patterson Jr. founded American Machine and Foundry and served as a vice president of the American Tobacco Company. In 1878, Patterson Sr., was accepted into the Moravian Church. He was a frequent benefactor to his alma mater. Patterson died on July 15, 1879 and was buried at Salem Woodland Cemetery.

References

1830 births
1879 deaths
People from Caldwell County, North Carolina
Mayors of Winston-Salem, North Carolina
University of North Carolina at Chapel Hill alumni
Businesspeople from North Carolina
North Carolina lawyers
19th-century American businesspeople
19th-century American lawyers
Burials at Salem Cemetery